This is a list of "twin towns" or "sister cities" — that is, pairs of towns or cities in different countries which have town twinning arrangements.

Note that the list is likely to always remain incomplete, since no canonical list of such arrangements exists.
Any twinning arrangement should be listed at two locations in the list: once for each of the towns involved in the arrangement.

Due to the extreme size of this list and for ease of navigation, the list is divided into separate lists by continent, which are then organized by country. Lists for some countries have in turn been moved to separate lists, which are linked individually below.

Africa
 List of twin towns and sister cities in Africa
 List of twin towns and sister cities in Cape Verde
 List of twin towns and sister cities in Egypt
 List of twin towns and sister cities in Kenya
 List of twin towns and sister cities in Morocco
 List of twin towns and sister cities in South Africa
 List of twin towns and sister cities in Tunisia

Asia
 List of twin towns and sister cities in Asia
 List of twin towns and sister cities in Armenia
 List of twin towns and sister cities in Azerbaijan
 List of twin towns and sister cities in Bangladesh
 List of twin towns and sister cities in China
 List of twin towns and sister cities in Georgia
 List of twin towns and sister cities in India
 List of twin towns and sister cities in Indonesia
 List of twin towns and sister cities in Iran
 List of twin towns and sister cities in Iraq
 List of twin towns and sister cities in Israel
 List of twin towns and sister cities in Japan
 List of twin towns and sister cities in Jordan
 List of twin towns and sister cities in Kazakhstan
 List of twin towns and sister cities in Malaysia
 List of twin towns and sister cities in Pakistan
 List of twin towns and sister cities in Palestine
 List of sister cities in the Philippines
 List of twin towns and sister cities in Russia
 List of twin towns and sister cities in South Korea
 List of twin towns and sister cities in Taiwan
 List of sister cities in Thailand

Australia and Oceania
 List of twin towns and sister cities in Oceania
 List of twin towns and sister cities in Australia
 List of twin towns and sister cities in Fiji
 List of twin towns and sister cities in New Zealand

Europe
 List of sister cities in Europe
 List of twin towns and sister cities in Albania
 List of twin towns and sister cities in Austria
 List of twin towns and sister cities in Belarus
 List of twin towns and sister cities in Belgium
 List of twin towns and sister cities in Bosnia and Herzegovina
 List of twin towns and sister cities in Bulgaria
 List of twin towns and sister cities in Croatia
 List of twin towns and sister cities in the Czech Republic
 List of twin towns and sister cities in Denmark
 List of twin towns and sister cities in Estonia
 List of twin towns and sister cities in Finland
 List of twin towns and sister cities in France
 List of twin towns and sister cities in Germany
 List of twin towns and sister cities in Greece
 List of twin towns and sister cities in Hungary
 List of twin towns and sister cities in Iceland
 List of twin towns and sister cities in the Republic of Ireland
 List of twin towns and sister cities in Italy
 List of twin towns and sister cities in Latvia
 List of twin towns and sister cities in Lithuania
 List of twin towns and sister cities in Luxembourg
 List of twin towns and sister cities in Malta
 List of twin towns and sister cities in Moldova
 List of twin towns and sister cities in Montenegro
 List of twin towns and sister cities in the Netherlands
 List of twin towns and sister cities in North Macedonia
 List of twin towns and sister cities in Norway
 List of twin towns and sister cities in Poland
 List of twin towns and sister cities in Portugal
 List of twin towns and sister cities in Romania
 List of twin towns and sister cities in Russia
 List of twin towns and sister cities in Serbia
 List of twin towns and sister cities in Slovakia
 List of twin towns and sister cities in Slovenia
 List of twin towns and sister cities in Spain
 List of twin towns and sister cities in Sweden
 List of twin towns and sister cities in Switzerland
 List of twin towns and sister cities in Turkey
 List of twin towns and sister cities in Ukraine
 List of twin towns and sister cities in the United Kingdom
 List of twin towns and sister cities in England
 List of twin towns and sister cities in Scotland
 List of twin towns and sister cities in Wales

North America
 List of twin towns and sister cities in North America
 List of twin towns and sister cities in Canada
 List of twin towns and sister cities in Cuba
 List of twin towns and sister cities in Mexico
 List of twin towns and sister cities in Nicaragua
 List of sister cities in the United States

South America
 List of twin towns and sister cities in South America
 List of twin towns and sister cities in Argentina
 List of twin towns and sister cities in Brazil
 List of twin towns and sister cities in Chile